This is the list of South Korean K-Pop boy band Pentagon videography. It includes music videos, music clips, variety shows, TV dramas and commercial films since its debut in 2016.

Music video

As lead artist

Korean

Japanese

As Featured Artist

Special music video

Music clips

Filmography

Drama

Variety show

Reality shows

Commercial films

See also
 Pentagon discography
 List of songs recorded by Pentagon

References

External links
Pentagon Official Youtube
PentagonVEVO
Cube Entertainment Japan

Videographies of South Korean artists
V